DYOZ (100.7 FM), broadcasting as 100.7 XFM, is a radio station owned by Global Broadcasting System, Inc. and operated by Y2H Broadcasting Network, Inc. The station's studio is located at Block 3, Lot 1, Villa Las Palmas Subdivision, Brgy. Quintin Salas, Jaro, Iloilo City, while its transmitter is located along Delgado St., Brgy. Mabolo-Delgado, Iloilo City.

The station was formerly known as Radio San Agustin FM from 1979 to 1989 and Z100 University from 1993 to early 2010s, when it was shut down for good. In early 2022, Yes2Health took over the station's operations and officially launched it on July 20 of the same year under the XFM network.

References

Radio stations in Iloilo City
Radio stations established in 1979
Radio stations established in 2022